JKFZ Cambridge International School is an international school in Qingshanhu, Nanchang, Jiangxi Province, China.

In August 2017, JKFZ CIS accepted its first cohort of students, offering the Cambridge curriculum in order to prepare students for Western university education. The school is affiliated with the Jiangxi University of Technology High School, a private non-profit high school founded in 2015.

References

External links
Official website

Schools in Jiangxi
International schools in China